Dame Cheryll Beatrice Sotheran  (11 October 1945 – 30 December 2017) was a New Zealand museum professional. She was the founding chief executive of the Museum of New Zealand Te Papa Tongarewa and was credited with the successful completion of the museum, considered the largest international museum project of the 1990s.

Early life and education
Sotheran was born on 11 October 1945 into a large Roman Catholic family in Stratford, a farming town in the Taranaki province. She was educated at St Mary's College in Auckland. She graduated from secondary teachers' college in 1968 and completed a Masters of Arts in English at the University of Auckland in 1969, then undertook further study in the Art History department at the university.

Career

Sotheran lectured in Art History at Auckland University before beginning her career in art administration when she was appointed director of the Govett-Brewster Art Gallery in 1986. While in Auckland, Sotheran was also a founding member of the Feminist Art Network, working with artists and curators, including Juliet Batten, Elizabeth Eastmond, Alexa Johnston, Claudia Pond Eyley, Priscilla Pitts and Carole Shepheard. In 1989, Sotheran was appointed as director of the Dunedin Public Art Gallery.

In 1992 Sotheran was appointed as the founding chief executive of the nascent Te Papa, created from the merger of New Zealand's National Museum and National Art Gallery in a new building on the Wellington waterfront. The construction of Te Papa was the biggest international museum project of the 1990s and included moving a hotel on wheels to enable the museum to be built on its waterfront site. The opening of Te Papa in February 1998 was completed on time and on budget. A documentary by Anna Cottrell and Gaylene Preston, Getting to Our Place, recorded the process of developing the museum on a new museological principle of biculturalism.

Sotheran weathered several controversies during her tenure at Te Papa, including ongoing criticism of the display of the national art collection and significant public protest when Tania Kovat's art work Virgin in a Condom was exhibited at the museum in an exhibition of work by the Young British Artists in 1998.

Sotheran resigned from Te Papa for health reasons in 2002. She subsequently acted as sector director of creative industries at New Zealand Trade and Enterprise, where she was responsible for the strategic development of the creative industries across all sectors in the New Zealand economy.

Honours and awards
Sotheran was awarded the New Zealand 1990 Commemoration Medal in 1990, and the New Zealand Suffrage Centennial Medal in 1993. In the 1999 New Year Honours, she was appointed a Dame Companion of the New Zealand Order of Merit, for services to museum administration. She received a distinguished alumni award from the University of Auckland, also in 1999.

Death
In 2013, Sotheran suffered a stroke. She battled health issues until her death in Auckland on 30 December 2017, from undisclosed causes, aged 72.

References

1945 births
2017 deaths
People from Stratford, New Zealand
People educated at St Mary's College, Auckland
Directors of museums in New Zealand
Women museum directors
New Zealand public servants
University of Auckland alumni
Dames Companion of the New Zealand Order of Merit
New Zealand women curators
New Zealand Roman Catholics
People associated with the Museum of New Zealand Te Papa Tongarewa
Recipients of the New Zealand Suffrage Centennial Medal 1993